Gaj is a small settlement east of Šmarje pri Jelšah in eastern Slovenia. The area is part of the traditional region of Styria and is now included in the Savinja Statistical Region.

References

External links
Gaj at Geopedia

Populated places in the Municipality of Šmarje pri Jelšah